Halifax Town Association Football Club was an English football club based in Halifax, West Yorkshire. They played in the English Football League from 1921–1993 and 1998–2002.

The club was dissolved in 2008, but reformed that July under the name of F.C. Halifax Town.

The club's stadium was The Shay.

History

Early years
The club was formed on 24 May 1911 at the Saddle Hotel. It initially played in the Yorkshire Combination and the Midland League. It was one of the founder members of Football League Third Division North in 1921, and remained in that division until restructuring in 1958, when it became a member of the Football League Third Division. Its highest league position prior to World War II was second in 1934–35.

1960s–1990s
They finished third, one place off promotion in the Football League Third Division in the 1970-71 season.

The next season, they finished in 17th place despite scoring only 17 goals, 4th lowest goals for that season. They just avoided relegation on goal difference after Rotherham United lost on the last matchday to Tranmere Rovers for Halifax to move up. In 1976, they were relegated to Division 4.

In 1993 they were relegated to the Football Conference.

Conference
The club found the Conference no easier than the fourth division. After several poor seasons with severe financial constraints, the club was demoralised as there seemed to be no way out. However, previous manager George Mulhall returned towards the end of the 1996–97 and avoided relegation from the Conference. The next season Mulhall and Kieran O'Regan made a number of additions to the squad including Jamie Paterson, Mark Bradshaw and Lee Martin to put together a title-winning team. The Shaymen were crowned champions of the Conference and thus regained Football League status. Free scoring Geoff Horsfield was also the top scorer in the Conference that season, scoring 30 goals.

Back In the Football League

At the start of the 1998–99 season, manager George Mulhall chose to retire and O'Regan was promoted to manager. Striker and top scorer Geoff Horsfield only played ten games before he was sold to Fulham for £300,000 in October 1998.  Halifax made a strong start to their league campaign and were amongst the leaders until December, after which their results started to drop off and they slipped into mid-table. Although only three points off playoff positions, O'Regan was sacked as manager by Chairman Jim Bown after a 0 – 0 draw with Rochdale in April 1999.

Return to Conference
Chris Wilder was appointed Halifax manager in July 2002. In their first season back in the Conference the Shaymen finished in eighth position.

In 2005–06 they finished 4th, and reached the Conference play-off final, losing to Hereford United.

Financial failure and dissolution
In 2007, the club was placed into administration by a local consortium trying to buy the club. In spite of being docked 10 points for entering administration, the club again survived relegation on the last day of the season.  However, the club failed to get a Company Voluntary Arrangement (CVA) to bring the club out of administration,

Though the club appealed against the decision to remove it from the Football Conference, the appeal was unsuccessful and the club was wound up.

In May 2008 it had been revealed that following a major error, the club owed over £800,000 to Her Majesty's Revenue and Customs, making the club more than £2 million in the red.

The Supporters' Trust prepared a back-up plan to form a new club should it be required. However, the club was re-formed by the same directors of the previous legal entity under the name FC Halifax Town and was accepted to play in the Northern Premier League Division One North in the 2008/09 season.

Stadiums
The club moved to The Shay in 1921 (hence the team's nickname "The Shaymen") and remained there until it folded.

From the mid-1990s on the Shay underwent substantial development, and Halifax RLFC moved in and shared the venue. The Football Trust assisted in providing funds for the redevelopment.

Players and managers

Notable players
For a list of notable Halifax Town players in sortable-list format see List of Halifax Town A.F.C. players; for all Halifax Town players with a Wikipedia article see :Category:Halifax Town A.F.C. players.

Managerial history

 1911 Joe McClelland
 1930 Alex Raisbeck
 1936 Jimmy Thomson
 1947 Jack Breedon
 1951 Billy Wootton
 1952 Gerald Henry
 1954 Bobby Browne (caretaker manager)
 1954 Willie Watson
 1956 Billy Burnikell
 1956  Harold Taylor and E. Vivien Booth
 1957 Harry Hooper
 1962 Don McEvoy
 1964 Willie Watson
 1966 Vic Metcalfe
 1967 Alan Ball Sr.
 1970 George Kirby
 1971 Ray Henderson
 1972 George Mulhall
 1974 Johnny Quinn
 1976 Alan Ball Sr.
 1977 Jimmy Lawson
 1978 George Kirby
 1981 Mickey Bullock
 1984 Billy Ayre (caretaker manager)
 1984 Mick Jones
 1986 Billy Ayre
 1990 Jim McCalliog
 1991 John McGrath
 1992 Mick Rathbone
 1993 Peter Wragg
 1994 John Bird
 1996 George Mulhall & Kieran O'Regan
 1996 John Carroll
 1997 George Mulhall & Kieran O'Regan
 1998 Kieran O'Regan
 1999 David Worthington
 1999 Mark Lillis
 2000 Peter Butler & Tony Parks
 2000 Paul Bracewell
 2001 Neil Redfearn & Tony Parks
 2001 Alan Little
 2002 Neil Redfearn (caretaker manager)
 2002 Chris Wilder

Sources:

Honours and club records
FA Trophy
Winners – 2015-16
FA Cup
Fifth Round – 1932–33, 1952–53
League Cup
Fourth Round – 1963–64
Football League Third Division
Third Place – 1970–71
Conference National
Champions – 1997–98 (87pts)
Record attendance
36,885 versus Tottenham Hotspur, FA Cup Fifth Round, 14 February 1953
Most appearances
John Pickering, 402 appearances (367 in League) from 1965 to 1974
Most goals scored
Ernie Dixon, 132 goals (127 league, 5 cup) from 1922 to 1930 (other source indicates 128 League goals and that he played for the club in two separate spells)
Most league goals in a season (individual)
Albert Valentine (1934–35) – 34
Most league goals in a season (club)
83 in Division Three North (1957–58)Record transfer fee paid£150,000 for Chris Tate in July 1999Record transfer fee received'''
£350,000 for Geoff Horsfield in October 1998
 A blue plaque honouring the club was erected by the Halifax Civic Trust.

References

External links

Official site of successor club

 
FC Halifax Town
National League (English football) clubs
Defunct English Football League clubs
Association football clubs established in 1911
Association football clubs disestablished in 2008
Defunct football clubs in West Yorkshire
Defunct football clubs in England
1911 establishments in England
2008 disestablishments in England
Sport in Halifax, West Yorkshire
Yorkshire Combination
Companies that have entered administration in the United Kingdom